József Keresztessy (7 August 1819 – 16 April 1895) was a Hungarian fencer. He was the founder of sword fencing in Hungary.

He was born in Budapest, Hungary. He received a post at the Fencing Institution in Pest under the direction of Ignác Friedrich where he worked as an assistant. After practicing for six years, he obtained a masters diploma in fencing. He then taught at the National Fencing Institute in Budapest. During the Hungarian Revolution he was a member of Lajos Aulich’s company. He took part in the battles of Buda, Pered, and as a soldier of György Klapka, at the Battles of Komárom. His fencing school was opened in 1851.

References

1819 births
1895 deaths
Hungarian male fencers
Hungarian sports coaches
Hungarian Revolution of 1848
Fencers from Budapest